The International Journal of Historical Archaeology is an academic journal devoted to the archaeology of historical sites.
According to the definition of Historical archaeology in the Americas it refers to the post-1492 period.

External links 
 

Archaeology journals
Publications established in 1997
Springer Science+Business Media academic journals
Quarterly journals
English-language journals